Jasper Township is an active township in Taney County, in the U.S. state of Missouri.

Jasper Township was founded in 1837, most likely taking its name from the local Jasper family.

References

Townships in Missouri
Townships in Taney County, Missouri